Daniel Carney (1944–1987) was a Rhodesian novelist. Three of his novels have been made into films. He was a brother of Erin Pizzey, also a writer.

Biography
Daniel Carney was born in Beirut in 1944, a son of a British diplomat. In 1963, he settled in Southern Rhodesia (soon to be renamed Rhodesia) and joined the British South Africa Police (BSAP), where he served for three and a half years. In 1968, he co-founded the estate agents Fox and Carney in Salisbury, Rhodesia. He died of cancer in 1987.

After his death, ownership rights of his novels and the films based on them passed to his family. They have consistently withheld permission to reproduce Daniel's novels, and have opposed re-release or sales of the movies based on the novels. In 2005, Tango Entertainment released a 30th anniversary edition of The Wild Geese (1978).  The film had been hampered by the collapse of its American distributor, Allied Artists. As a result, the film was only partially distributed in the United States, where it was a box office disappointment, despite being the fourteenth-highest-grossing film, worldwide, of 1978.

Published works
 , set in Rhodesia, was adapted as a 1976 movie titled Whispering Death, a.k.a. Night of the Askaris, Death in the Sun, and Albino. 
  (originally titled The Thin White Line), set in the Congo, was adapted as the film The Wild Geese (1978), with a screenplay by Reginald Rose (author of 12 Angry Men). 
 , is set in Rhodesia. Its film rights were optioned by Euan Lloyd, producer of The Wild Geese and Wild Geese II, but the project was not filmed.
 , set in Germany and republished as The Wild Geese II and The Return of the Wild Geese, was adapted as a movie titled Wild Geese II (1985). 
  is set in Macau.

References

External links
 
 Photo of Carney's grave in Zimbabwe

1944 births
1987 deaths
Rhodesian novelists
Zimbabwean novelists
Zimbabwean male writers
Male novelists
British South Africa Police officers
20th-century novelists
British emigrants to Rhodesia
Deaths from cancer in Zimbabwe
Writers from Beirut
20th-century male writers
White Rhodesian people
Zimbabwean people of British descent
People from Harare